The Golden Rose Synagogue is a synagogue on Kotsyubinskiy Street/Sholom Aleichem street in Dnipro, Ukraine.

History

The Golden Rose synagogue was built in 1868 (when Dnipro was named Yekaterinoslav). In 1924 the building was used as a workers' club and a warehouse and above the portice a seal of the Union of Soviet Socialist Republics was located in place of the Magen David. In 1996 the building was returned to the Jewish community. In 1999 the reconstruction began, following the design by a local Jewish architect, A. Dolnik. Frank Meisler, an Israeli artist, designed the foyer, the prayer hall and the Holy Ark.

Above the sanctuary entrance is a representation of golden roses, made by  Meisler.

A small rotunda between the lobby and sanctuary is decorated with the first line of the Sh’ma Israel prayer. The first words of Sh'ma Israel in Hebrew are at left, but the first words in Russian are at right. The two versions continue around the rotunda until the last words in Russian and Hebrew meet on the opposite side. The doors to the Aaron haKodesh illustrate the Ten Commandments.

The Jewish community had plans to build a Jewish community center with Museum called "Tkumah" (rebirth) adjacent to the synagogue that will also house a library, soup kitchen, classrooms and offices. In October, 2012 such multifunctional center was opened under the name Menorah center.

The Director of the Jewish Community of Dinpro is Vyacheslav Brez. The Chief Rabbi of Dnipro is Shmuel Kaminetzky, who is also a leading member of the FJC.

See also
Synagogue architecture

References

External links
 Golden rose Dnipro
The three lives of "Golden Rose" (the history of synagogue) Dnipro

Orthodox synagogues in Ukraine
Buildings and structures in Dnipro
19th-century synagogues